Miles Sandys ( – 22 October 1601) was an English courtier and politician. He sat in each of the eight Parliaments from 1563 to 1597, yet never represented the same constituency twice.

Sandys was the brother of Edwin Sandys, Archbishop of York. Like his brother, he was educated at St John's College, Cambridge, matriculating in 1544. He was admitted to the Middle Temple in 1551, became a Bencher in 1578, and served as Treasurer 1588–95.

He was an influential crown official, working in the Court of Queen's Bench and becoming Clerk of the Crown. He sat as MP for Taunton (1563–1567), Lancaster (1571), Bridport (1572), Buckinghamshire (1584–85), Abingdon (1586–87), Plymouth (1588–89), Andover (1593) and Stockbridge (1597–98).

He died on 22 October 1601 in Latimer, Buckinghamshire.

Family
Sandys was married firstly to Hester Clifton, daughter of William Clifton. They had four sons and three daughters:
 Sir Edwin Sandys  (–1608)
 Sir William Sandys (1565–1641)
 Hester Sandys (1569–1656), married Sir Thomas Temple, Bt
 George Sandys
 Henry Sandys
 Elizabeth Sandys, married Sir Edmund Conquest, High Sheriff of Bedfordshire 1618
 Bridget Sandys, married Sir Nicholas Hyde, Bt

Sandys was married secondly to Bridget Colt, widow of alderman Woodcock of London.

References
 

Members of the Parliament of England for Plymouth
1601 deaths
Alumni of St John's College, Cambridge
Members of the Middle Temple
English MPs 1563–1567
English MPs 1571
English MPs 1572–1583
English MPs 1584–1585
English MPs 1586–1587
English MPs 1589
English MPs 1593
English MPs 1597–1598
Year of birth uncertain